Speed Sisters is a 2015 documentary film by Amber Fares that follows the all-female Palestinian racing team the Speed Sisters and explores the social issues surrounding their career. It was pitched at the 2011 MeetMarket part of Sheffield Doc/Fest.

Production
The film is an international co-production between companies in Palestine, the United States, Qatar, the United Kingdom, Denmark and Canada.

Reception
Speed Sisters received generally positive reviews from critics. On Rotten Tomatoes, the film has an 80% score based on 5 reviews, with an average rating of 7.7/10.

References

External links
 
 
 

2015 films
Qatari documentary films
Auto racing films
Palestinian documentary films
American auto racing films
American sports documentary films
British auto racing films
Danish documentary films
Canadian auto racing films
Canadian sports documentary films
Documentary films about auto racing
Arabic-language Canadian films
British sports documentary films
2010s Canadian films
2010s American films
2010s British films